{{Infobox VG series
|title = Gunpey
|image = Gunpey logo.gif
|caption = Logo of the WonderSwan version
|genre = Puzzle
|platforms =  Arcade, WonderSwan, WonderSwan Color, PlayStation, Nintendo DS, mobile phone, PlayStation Portable, iOS, Android
|developer = Koto LaboratoryQ EntertainmentArt Co., LtdTOSE Co. Ltd
|publisher = BandaiBandai Namco Entertainment
| first release version =Gunpey (WonderSwan)| first release date =
| latest release version =Gunpey (PSP)| latest release date  =
}}
, often written as Gun Pey or GunPey, is a series of handheld puzzle games released by Bandai. It was originally released for the WonderSwan, and has been ported to WonderSwan Color, PlayStation, Nintendo DS and PlayStation Portable. The game was named as a tribute to the developer of the game, Gunpei Yokoi. He is known for developing several handheld consoles such as Nintendo's Game Boy, Virtual Boy, and Bandai's Wonderswan system. In the series, players move line fragments vertically in  a grid in order to make a single branching line connect horizontally from one end to the other. The objective of the game differs by what game mode players choose.

Gameplay

Gunpey features a 5×10 cell grid and line fragments spread across it varying from shapes such as caret (∧), inverted caret (∨), left slash (＼), and right slash (／). The player controls a cursor that can be moved around the playing field. The cursor only ability is to flip vertical adjacent cells, allowing the player to move line fragments or switch them with another segment. The goal of the game is to piece the broken lines together to form a connected line that connects horizontally from one end to the other. After a line is completed, the line will temporarily flash and disappear. The player can connect additional branching segments while it's flashing to achieve a combo bonus. A bonus is also awarded when all of the line segments are cleared from the playing field.

 "Endless Mode" features line fragments appearing from the bottom of the grid and gradually move to up to the top as more pieces appear. The rate at which the new pieces scroll up from the bottom increases as the levels go on. The game ends if any line fragments reach the top of the screen before they have been assembled into a full line.
 "Stage Mode" bears a resemblance to Endless Mode. The goal is to clear lines using a specific number of line fragments as they appear from the bottom of the grid. Once the number of lines has been cleared, the player can move on to the next stage. The number of used line fragments needed to clear a stage and the rate of new line fragments appearing increases as more stages are cleared.
 "Puzzle Mode" features a specific number of lines are set per each stage. All the line fragments must be connected without a single line remaining.
 "Story Mode" is a mode where the player battles against the CPU in order to progress the story. The goal is to clear lines with a certain number of lines similar to Puzzle Mode, however the CPU adds several mechanics that may affect progress such as shadowed-panels, side-scrolling grid, and falling bombs that can be thrown upwards against the CPU. A vertical gauge is also featured. If the gauge is filled completely, the shadowed-panels disappear. The Story revolves around a frog named Vincent as he saves a cat named Sherry from a group of outlaws. In Tarepanda no Gunpey, the story revolves around Tarepanda as he rolls around reaching specific destinations around the Earth and collecting photos of different Tarepanda slowly becoming a pile of Tarepandas.
 "VS mode" allows two players to battle against each other. Players can choose difficulties between High, Normal, Low, and Poor. 'High' rewards less SP per clearing a line as 'Poor' rewards more SP.

Games

Reception

Famitsu magazine scored the WonderSwan version of the game a 33 out of 40. Retro Gamer ranked the original WonderSwan game #2 on its "Top Ten WonderSwan Games" praising its simplicity and variety of modes it offers. DefunctGames gave the game a B+ noting its different tone of gameplay compared to other puzzle games from its time.  DefunctGames also gave a B+ for the WonderSwan Color version, Gunpey EX, noting its simplicity and functionality of both controls and graphics, but criticizing the music quality. Modojo gave Gunpey EX a 3 out of 5 giving it a mix review stating: "The fact is Gunpeys focus on individual circuits instead of complex combos coupled the clunky vertical shuffling of the wires made it an experience I couldn't lose myself in, like so many other titles. Still, it's good to see that the puzzle genre still has life left, and Gunpey EX is a fairly robust package".

NintendoLife gave the game a 6 out of 10: "The concept just isn't compelling or addictive enough to grant the game classic status and the developers haven’t really added anything to change that". GameSpot gave both the DS and PSP version a 7.7 out of 10: "Not only is it fun and challenging, but it's got a crazy sense of style and a rewarding level of difficulty". Eurogamer gave the PSP version 7 out of 10, praising its level designs and difficulty but criticizing the time it takes to play the game. IGN gave the game a 6.1 out of 10: "Gunpey is a somewhat fun puzzle game, but it'll never reach classic status because it's one of those games that relies too much on random placement of tiles". IGN, however, gave the PSP version a less favorable review criticizing the gameplay for it being dull and boring.

References
Notes

Citation

External links
Gunpey official site
Gunpey PlayStation page
Gunpey Rebirth (DS/PSP) portal

1999 video games
2006 video games
Falling block puzzle games
Mobile games
Music video games
Nintendo DS games
PlayStation Portable games
Puzzle video games
Q Entertainment games
Bandai Namco Entertainment franchises
Video games developed in Japan
WonderSwan games
WonderSwan Color games